Isaiah Foster (born August 12, 2003) is an American professional soccer player who currently plays in Major League Soccer for FC Cincinnati.

Career

Youth 
Foster played with Bethesda SC from 2012. In 2016 he was selected for the National Identification and Development Program's ALL id2 team, where he was ranked one of the top eleven in the camp by Top Drawer Soccer. He has been on two champion teams; the Dallas SuperCopa and the Dallas Cup.

Professional 
On February 17, 2022, Foster signed a professional contract with USL Championship club Colorado Springs Switchbacks. He made his professional debut on March 19, 2022, appearing as an injury-time substitute during a 1–0 win over Monterey Bay FC.

On January 5, 2023, FC Cincinnati acquired Foster via MLS Waivers. In order to acquire Foster, Cincinnati traded $50,000 in General Allocation Money to D.C. United in exchange for the number one spot in the MLS Waiver Order.

References 

2003 births
Living people
American soccer players
Association football defenders
Colorado Springs Switchbacks FC players
FC Cincinnati players
People from Frederick, Maryland
Soccer players from Maryland
USL Championship players